Sir Richard Charles Leese, CBE (born 21 April 1951) is a former British politician who served as the leader of Manchester City Council from 1996 to 2021. He has been a member of the Labour Party since 1984. 

On 6 May 2017, Leese was appointed Deputy Mayor for Business and Economy by Mayor of Greater Manchester, and former Health Secretary, Andy Burnham. He stepped down as leader of the council on 1 December 2021 and resigned from the council on 4 January 2022, having spent 38 years as a councillor.

Education
Leese was born and brought up in Mansfield, Nottinghamshire. He was educated at The Brunts School and went on to the University of Warwick, graduating with an undergraduate degree in Mathematics.

Career
Initially, Leese worked as a teacher of mathematics at Sidney Stringer School in Coventry and as an exchange teacher at Washington Junior High School in Duluth, Minnesota (USA) before moving to Manchester to take up a post as a youth worker. Leese has been employed variously in youth work, community work, and education research 1979–1988.

Leese was elected to the Manchester City Council in 1984 and was its deputy leader from 1990 until 1996, having previously chaired the Education Committee (1986–1990) and Finance Committee (1990–1995). From 1984 until 4 January 2022, he was a Labour councillor in the Crumpsall ward.

He was knighted in the Queen's Birthday Honours 2006 List after overseeing the 10-year regeneration of the city after the IRA bomb of 1996. He was awarded a knighthood for "services to local government".

Leese was one of the main advocates of Congestion Charging in Greater Manchester, as part of a bid to the Government's Transport Innovation Fund (TIF) for a £2.7 billion package of transport funding for Greater Manchester. Congestion charging was ultimately rejected by the local population in a referendum.

He is current chair of the North West Regional Leaders Board (4NW).

In September 2021 during an interview with the Manchester Evening News, Leese announced he would be stepping down as leader of Manchester City Council in December 2021 and would not be standing in the 2022 local elections.

In October 2021, Leese was announced as the new Chair-designate of the Integrated Care Board (ICB) for Greater Manchester.

Controversy

On 14 April 2010, the BBC reported that Leese had stood down temporarily from his post as leader of Manchester City Council after having been arrested on suspicion of the common assault of his 16-year-old stepdaughter. He was released after accepting a police caution and admitting striking his stepdaughter across the face.

References

1951 births
20th-century English politicians
21st-century English politicians
Alumni of the University of Warwick
Commanders of the Order of the British Empire
Councillors in Manchester
Knights Bachelor
Labour Party (UK) councillors
Leaders of local authorities of England
Living people
People from Mansfield
Members of the Greater Manchester Combined Authority